The Tennislife Cup is a tennis tournament held in Naples, Italy since 2007. The event is part of the ATP Challenger Tour and is played on outdoor red clay courts.

Past finals

Singles

Doubles

External links 
 
ITF search

 
ATP Challenger Tour
Clay court tennis tournaments
Tennis tournaments in Italy